Yuri Paramoshkin (born November 3, 1937 in Elektrostal, Russia) is a retired ice hockey player who played in the Soviet Hockey League.  He played for HC Dynamo Moscow.  He was inducted into the Russian and Soviet Hockey Hall of Fame in 1991.

External links
 Russian and Soviet Hockey Hall of Fame bio

1937 births
Living people
People from Elektrostal
Soviet ice hockey players
HC Dynamo Moscow players
Russian ice hockey players
Sportspeople from Moscow Oblast